K&K Verlagsanstalt is a German record label based in Landau in der Pfalz and owned by Josef-Stefan Kindler and Andreas Otto Grimminger.

The company was established in 1990 by Josef-Stefan Kindler. In 1992 the musician and sound engineer Andreas Otto Grimminger joined the company, which is a member of Börsenverein des Deutschen Buchhandels and the Verband Deutscher Tonmeister. The label concentrates on audiophile concert recordings. Currently these CD-series are created by Josef-Stefan Kindler and Andreas Otto Grimminger:

 The Maulbronn Monastery Edition: A selection of about 25 concerts every year, which take place at the German UNESCO World Heritage Site Maulbronn Monastery. 
 Authentic Classical Concerts: Concert recordings at interesting historical places. 
 Swing & More series

Artists and ensembles released on K&KDiscogs
Amir Tebenikhin (Pianist)
Franz Vorraber (Pianist)
Lilya Zilberstein (Pianist)
David Thomas (Vocal-Soloist)
Michael Chance (Vocal-Soloist)
Nancy Argenta (Vocal-Soloist)
Miriam Allan (Vocal-Soloist)
Jürgen Budday (Conductor)
Paweł Przytocki (Conductor)
Capella Istropolitana (Orchestra)
Württemberg Chamber Orchestra Heilbronn 
European Union Baroque Orchestra
Maulbronn Chamber Choir (Choir)
Hannoversche Hofkapelle (Hanoverian Court Orchestra)
Gabriel Rivano Trio
Singer Pur
Trio Fontenay

References 

Classical music record labels
Early music record labels
German independent record labels
Record labels established in 1990
Audiophile record labels
Music production companies
IFPI members
Music organisations based in Germany